Phil Cahoy Jr. is a retired American gymnast.

Career

Elite
Cahoy was a member of the 1980 Olympic team but did not compete because of the boycott.  He participated in 1984 Olympic trials but was hindered by injuries.  A competitive attempt in 1988 was also unsuccessful because of injury.

Cahoy was a regular member of three World gymnastics teams: 1978, 1981, and 1985.  He was an alternate for the 1983 squad. In 1986, he attended the Goodwill Games, where he came in fourth on pommel horse and sixth on parallel bars.

References

External links

Cahoy, Phil
1980 Olympic Gymnastics Team reflects 30 years later
1997 Hall of Fame Inductee at Nebraska Hall of Fame
Phil Cahoy Sr. at Nebraska Athletics
Phil Cahoy at Central Nebraska Orthopedics

Year of birth missing (living people)
Living people
American male artistic gymnasts
American orthopedic surgeons
Nebraska Cornhuskers men's gymnasts
Competitors at the 1986 Goodwill Games